Acrobasis palliolella, the mantled acrobasis moth, is a species of snout moth in the genus Acrobasis. It was described by Ragonot in 1887, and is known from Ontario, Canada, and the eastern United States.

The larvae feed on Carya species, including Carya ovata and Carya carolinae-septentrionalis.

References

Moths described in 1887
Acrobasis
Moths of North America